Thomas Grosvenor may refer to:

Sir Thomas Grosvenor, 3rd Baronet (1656–1700), MP for Chester
Sir Thomas Grosvenor, 5th Baronet (1693–1733), MP for Chester, son of the above
Thomas Grosvenor (1734–1795), MP for Chester, nephew of the above
Thomas Grosvenor (British Army officer) (1764–1851), British soldier and MP, son of the above
Thomas P. Grosvenor (1778–1817), American politician